Hypleurochilus brasil is a species of combtooth blenny from the subfamily Salarinae of the family Blenniidae. It is endemic to the reefs around Trindade and Martin Vaz off Brazil in the western South Atlantic Ocean.

Description
Hypleurochilus brasil is distinguished from other species in the genus Hypleurochilus by having 3 rays in the pelvic fin, an average of 123 spines and 12 soft rays in the dorsal fin and 2 spines and 15-16 rays in the anal fin. It also lacks any blackened stripes and has a green or white nape nape green or white and many, small red spots along its body, these spots decrease in size towards the tail. In life the body of this blenny is translucent, tinted faintly brown in juveniles and orange in adults, the adults having pae, transverse bars on the head and close to the tail.

Distribution and habitat 

Etymology
The specific name brasil is the Portuguese spelling of Brazil, the country's name being derived from the red coloured wood of the tree Caesalpinia echinate and so the name refers both to the country of its origin and to the red spots along this fish's body.

References

brasil
Endemic fauna of Brazil
Fish of Brazil
Fish described in 2013